Eddie Frierson is an American voice actor and writer.  He has provided voices for such films as Wreck-It Ralph, Hotel Transylvania, The Princess and the Frog, ParaNorman, Curious George, Tangled the video games Medal of Honor: Airborne and Sengoku Basara: Samurai Heroes and the animated television series MÄR: Märchen Awakens Romance.

On the stage, he played Baseball Hall of Fame pitcher Christy Mathewson in the one-man show Matty: An Evening with Christy Mathewson.

Life and career

Originally from Nashville, Tennessee, Frierson has been doing voicework for many anime series and movies since the 1980s, and has also been a voice actor for two of Saban Entertainment's most well-known shows - the Power Rangers franchise and VR Troopers. While during his tenure in the Saban shows, he only did voicework for one-shot characters in the earlier years, he was able to play a major role in 2001's Power Rangers Time Force when he did the voice of the mad robot scientist Frax. After the PR franchise moved to New Zealand in 2003 (which laid off much of the PR crew, Frierson included), Frierson has continued to do voicework for various anime series such as .hack and Robotech, as well as voicework in animated children's movies such as Curious George, Chicken Little, and The Wild. He has also done voicework for different video game franchises, such as the Medal of Honor series.

Frierson's theater work includes roles such as Horatio in Mark Ringer's staging of Hamlet, and Flute in A Midsummer Night's Dream at Nevada Shakespeare in the Park. He twice won the prestigious Maurice Scott Award for Los Angeles theatre for his performances as Dapper in Ben Jonson's The Alchemist at the Globe Playhouse and as Count Vronsky in Anna Karenina at Theatre Rapport.  He also won a New England Drama Critic's award for his portrayal of the dim-witted Red Sox pitcher Tank in Steve Kluger's acclaimed nine-inning comedy, Bullpen.

Eddie was on Tic Tac DOugh in the 1985-86 season and won $4900 in cash.

Matty
 
Frierson's award-winning one-man show Matty: An Evening With Christy Mathewson, directed by fellow voice actor Kerrigan Mahan, is built around Hall of Fame baseball pitcher Christy Mathewson.  Frierson has taken the show across the country, including Off-Broadway in New York, and National Public Radio named it one of the 10 best shows of the New York theatre season. He won Drama-Logue Awards as both an actor and writer during the show's Los Angeles engagement. He has performed the show in Mathewson's hometown of Factoryville, Pennsylvania, at the pitcher's alma mater Bucknell University, and at the Baseball Hall of Fame.

Frierson has formed The Mathewson Foundation, dedicated to the preservation of American History through baseball.  He plans to focus those efforts and locate the Foundation in Factoryville.  Also in the works for Frierson are the first true biographies of Christy, both in book form and for the big screen.

Filmography

Anime
 .hack - Additional Voices
 3x3 Eyes - Yakumo Fujii (Streamline dub only)
 The Adventures of Mini-Goddess - Blue Rat
 Akira - Additional voices (credited as "Christopher Mathewson") (Streamline and Geneon dubs)
 Babel II - Additional Voices
 Battle Athletes - USSA Official
 Battle Athletes Victory - Additional Voices
 Carried by the Wind: Tsukikage Ran - Crying Husband; Fisherman; Tokuji; Wandering Samurai
 Casshan: Robot Hunter - Additional Voices
 The Cockpit - Various
 Cowboy Bebop - Space Warrior
 Crying Freeman - Chen (Streamline Dub)
 Digimon Adventure - Datamon
 Dirty Pair - Plant Manager
 Dogtanian and the Three Muskehounds - Aramis
 Dragon Ball - Tenshinhan (Shinto) (Harmony Gold dub only)
 Dual! Parallel Trouble Adventure - Various
 El Hazard - Makoto Mizuhara
 Fist of the North Star - Additional Voices
 Fushigi Yuugi - Various
 Gatchaman (1994) - Ken
 Gatekeepers 21 - Student, Gang Leader
 Ghost in the Shell: Stand Alone Complex 2nd GIG - Various
 Golgo 13: Queen Bee - Various
 The Professional: Golgo 13 - Gold
 Hajime no Ippo - Mamoru Takamura
 Honeybee Hutch - Various
 Kikaider - Silver Hakaider
 Kyo Kara Maoh! - Alford, Dakaskos, Erhalt
 Laputa: Castle in the Sky - Louis, Old Engineer (Original dub only), Additional Voices
 Little Women - Additional Voices
 Maple Town - Additional Voices
 MÄR - Edward
 Mobile Suit Gundam: The Movie Trilogy - Kai Shiden
 Mobile Suit Gundam: The 08th MS Team - Eledore Massis
 Mobile Suit Gundam 0083: Stardust Memory - Jaburo Officer A
 Naruto - Hakkaku
 Noein - Atori
 Noozles - Various
 Outlaw Star - Race Official, Silgrian
 Robotech - Lynn Kyle
 Robotech: The Shadow Chronicles - Louis Nichols
 Saint Tail - Additional Voices
 Serial Experiments Lain - J.J.
 Street Fighter II V - Various (Animaze Dub)
 Tenchi in Tokyo - Mr. Fujisawa
 Tenchi Muyo! - Male GP Controller
 Tenchi Muyo! in Love - Male GP Controller
 Trigun - Additional Voices
 Tokyo Pig - Additional Voices
 Wowser - Additional Voices
 X - Additional Voices
 Yukikaze - Richard Burgadish
 Zillion - Dave
 Zillion: Burning Night - Dave

Non-anime
 The Return of Dogtanian - Aramis
 God, the Devil and Bob - Guest Star
 Iznogoud - Various
 Jin Jin and the Panda Patrol - Additional Voices
 Oliver Twist - Additional Voices
 Walter Melon - Additional Voices
 Willy Fog 2 - Tico
 Wisdom of the Gnomes - Additional Voices

Live-action
 Cheers - 1st Customer
 Mighty Morphin Power Rangers - Blue Globbor, Octophantom, Weldo (voices, uncredited)
 Power Rangers Lightspeed Rescue - Strikning (voice)
 Power Rangers Lost Galaxy - Ironite (voice)
 Power Rangers Time Force - Frax (voice)
 Power Rangers Turbo - Terror Tooth (voice, uncredited)
 Power Rangers Zeo - Mechanizer (voice, uncredited)
 Touched by an Angel - Announcer
 VR Troopers - Gunslinger, Rollbot (voices)

Film
 A Little Help - Parrot
 Barnyard - Cow and Horse
 Bigfoot: The Unforgettable Encounter - Bigfoot Vocal Characterization
 The Call - Additional Voices
 Chicken Little - Male Bear
 Cloudy with a Chance of Meatballs 2 - Additional Voices
 Curious George - Additional Voices
 Dragon Ball: Mystical Adventure - Shinto (Tien) (Harmony Gold dub)
 Dr. Dolittle - Skunk (voice)
 El Hazard: The Magnificent World - Makoto Mizuhara
 El Hazard: The Magnificent World 2 - Makoto Mizuhara
 El Hazard: The Alternative World - Makoto Mizuhara
 Elysium - Various
 Fly Me to the Moon - Commander Aldrin
 From Up on Poppy Hill - Additional Voices (English version)
 Frozen - Crowd Member #2
 Going Under - Guy in Bar
 Her Married Lover - Additional Voices
 Hotel Transylvania - Additional Voices
 Incredibles 2 - Additional Voices
 Kiki's Delivery Service - Tombo (Streamline version only), Additional Voices (both Streamline & Disney dubs)
 Laputa: Castle in the Sky - Henri, Old Engineer (original English dub), Additional voices (both English versions)
 Legends of Oz: Dorothy's Return - Additional Voices
 Life as We Know It - Sports Announcer
 Osmosis Jones - Police Officer of Frank Police Department (voice)
 ParaNorman - Additional Voices (Blithe Hollow Townspeople)
 The Princess and the Frog - New Orleans Man #2
 Pump Up the Volume - Anchor
 Robotech: The Shadow Chronicles - Louis Nichols, Haydonite
 Racing Stripes - Additional Voices
 Roadside Romeo — Additional Voices 
 Shaolin Soccer - Additional Voices
 Smother - Ralph
 Street Fighter II: The Animated Movie - Ken Masters (credited as "Ted Richards")
 Tangled - Additional Voices
 The Tale of Despereaux - Additional Voices
 Twilight of the Cockroaches - Airman, Retreat, Walla (English version)
 The Wild - Penguin
 Wildfire - Race Announcer
 Wreck-It Ralph - Additional Voices
 Your Friends and Neighbours - Additional Voices
 Zootopia - Additional Voices

Video games
 Ace Combat Zero: The Belkan War - Additional voices (English-dubbed version)
 EverQuest II: Echoes of Faydwer - Mazkeen, Fae_1 emotes (male), Lyrech Human 2 (male)
 Inherit the Earth: Quest for the Orb - Various
 Kessen II - Li Dian (English-dubbed version)
 Medal of Honor - Additional Voices
 Sengoku Basara: Samurai Heroes - Yoshishige Satake (English-dubbed version)
 Seven Samurai 20XX - Epsilon/Epsilon Doll (English-dubbed version)
 Star Trek: Judgment Rites - Lucas, Lt. Kyle, Romulan
 Star Trek: 25th Anniversary - Elasi Captain, Ens. Everts
 Suikoden V - Isato, Roog (English-dubbed version)

Stage
Matty: An Evening With Christy Mathewson - Christy Mathewson

References

External links
Eddie Frierson's Official Website
Official Website for Matty: An Evening With Christy Mathewson

20th-century American male actors
21st-century American male actors
Male actors from California
Male actors from Los Angeles
American male stage actors
American male video game actors
American male voice actors
Living people
People from Sherman Oaks, Los Angeles
UCLA Film School alumni
Male actors from Nashville, Tennessee
Year of birth missing (living people)